Room of Death is a 2007 French crime film based on the novel La Chambre des morts by Franck Thilliez.

Cast 
 Mélanie Laurent as Lucie Hennebelle
 Éric Caravaca as Moreno / Pierre Norman
 Gilles Lellouche as Sylvain
 Jonathan Zaccaï as Vigo
 Céline Sallette as Annabelle
 Laurence Côte as Alex
 Jean-François Stévenin as Léon
 Fanny Cottençon as La mère de Lucie 
 Nathalie Richard as Raphaelle
 Lola Créton as Eléonore

References

External links 

2000s crime films
French crime films
Films scored by Nathaniel Méchaly
2000s French films